Yu Mingtao (November 1917 – May 28, 2017)  was a politician of the People's Republic of China. He was the first Auditor General of National Audit Office of the People's Republic of China. He also served as governor of Shaanxi Province, and president of China Audit Society. 

Born in Shen County, Hebei Province, he joined Chinese Communist Party in October 1936. After Lushan Conference in 1959, together with Hua Guofeng, he was elected as secretary in the secretariat of CCP Hunan committee. He was promoted to a standing committee member of CCP Hunan committee and director about economics commission of Hunan, in charge of industry, transportation and trade.

Since 1961, Yu had served as a standing committee member of CCP center-south bureau and director of its finance and trading commission, secretary of CCP Guangzhou municipal committee, vice director of Guangzhou municipal revolutionary commission, and governor of Shaanxi.

In 1983, Yu was appointed as first Auditor General of newly founded National Audit Office. 

He was a member of 11th and 12th Central Committee of Chinese Communist Party. He also was a member of 13th Central Advisory Commission.

References

External links
 Yu Mingtao's profile at people.com.cn

1917 births
2017 deaths
People's Republic of China politicians from Hebei
Chinese Communist Party politicians from Hebei
Politicians from Hengshui
Governors of Shaanxi
Governors of Henan
People from Shenzhou City